Mario Scalzo (born November 11, 1984) is a Canadian professional ice hockey player. Scalzo is currently playing for Eispiraten Crimmitschau in the DEL2.

Career 
Born in Saint-Hubert, Quebec, Scalzo played junior hockey in the Quebec Major Junior Hockey League for the Victoriaville Tigres and the Rimouski Océanic. He is perhaps the most well known for his junior hockey days in Rimouski where he played on the 2005 Memorial Cup runner-up team captained by Sidney Crosby. Other major pieces of that team included Marc Antoine Poulliot and Dany Roussin, both linemates of Crosby. That year, the three along with Scalzo lead the Oceanic in scoring. After signing as a free agent with the Dallas Stars of the NHL in 2005, Scalzo spent three seasons in the American Hockey League playing for the Iowa Stars and the Norfolk Admirals. He was traded to the Tampa Bay Lightning organization in 2007 for Bryce Lampman. Scalzo joined Red Bull Salzburg in 2008 and signed than on 7 April 2009 with Adler Mannheim. On April 29, 2011, Scalzo was added to the Canadian roster for the 2011 IIHF World Championship held in Slovakia
.

Career statistics

Regular season and playoffs

International

References

External links

1984 births
Canadian ice hockey defencemen
EC Red Bull Salzburg players
Ice hockey people from Quebec
Iowa Stars players
Living people
Norfolk Admirals players
Rimouski Océanic players
Victoriaville Tigres players
Canadian expatriate ice hockey players in Austria